De Leon High School is a public high school located in the city of De Leon, Texas (USA) and classified as a 2A school by the UIL. It is a part of the De Leon Independent School District located in northeastern Comanche County. In 2015, the school was rated "Met Standard" by the Texas Education Agency.

Athletics
The De Leon Bearcats compete in the following sports:

 Baseball
 Basketball
 Cross Country
 Football
 Golf
 Softball
 Tennis
 Track & Field
 Volleyball

State titles
Football  - 
1975(1A)

State Finalist
Football  - 
1976(1A), 1990(1A)

Notable alumni
Tex Irvin - American football player
Sid Miller (Class of 1974) - Republican member of the Texas House of Representatives from Erath County, 2001-2013

References

External links
De Leon ISD website

Public high schools in Texas
Education in Comanche County, Texas